The 1978 Hawaii Rainbow Warriors football team represented the University of Hawaiʻi at Mānoa as an independent during the 1978 NCAA Division I-A football season. In their second season under head coach Dick Tomey, the Rainbow Warriors compiled a 6–5 record.

Schedule

References

Hawaii
Hawaii Rainbow Warriors football seasons
Hawaii Rainbow Warriors football